Live in Verona is a 2014 live album and concert film by English hard rock band Deep Purple's mk VIII lineup credited as Deep Purple with Orchestra, and performed alongside the Neue Philharmonie Frankfurt conducted by Stephen Bentley-Klein. It was recorded at the Arena di Verona, a Roman amphitheater originally built in 30 AD, on 18 July 2011. It was released as a Blu-ray and DVD on 21 October 2014 by Eagle Rock Entertainment, and as a CD in Japan on 8 October 2014 by Ward Records.

Track listing
All songs written by Ritchie Blackmore, Ian Gillan, Roger Glover, Jon Lord, and Ian Paice except where noted.

DVD / Blu Ray 
 "Deep Purple Overture" 
 "Highway Star"
 "Hard Lovin' Man"
 "Maybe I'm a Leo"
 "Strange Kind of Woman"
 "Rapture of the Deep"
 "Woman from Tokyo"
 "Contact Lost"
 "When a Blind Man Cries"
 "The Well-Dressed Guitar"
 "Knocking at Your Back Door"
 "Lazy"
 "No One Came"
 Don Airey solo
 "Perfect Strangers"
 "Space Truckin’"
 "Smoke on the Water"
 "Hush" – Bonus feature
 "Black Night" – Bonus feature
 "Hush" (South)
 "Black Night"

2CD track listing

Disc 1 
"Deep Purple Overture" (Stephen Bentley-Klein, Jack Bruce, Pete Brown, Eric Clapton, Blackmore, Gillan, Glover, Lord, Paice) 
"Highway Star" 
"Hard Lovin' Man" 
"Maybe I'm a Leo" 
"Strange Kind of Woman" 
"Rapture of the Deep" (Gillan, Steve Morse, Roger Glover, Don Airey, Paice) 
"Woman from Tokyo" 
"Contact Lost" (Morse)
Steve Morse solo (Morse)
"When a Blind Man Cries" 
"The Well Dressed Guitar" (Morse)

Disc 2 
 "Knocking at Your Back Door" (Blackmore, Gillan, Glover)
 "Lazy"
 "No One Came"
 Don Airey solo
 "Perfect Strangers" (Gillan, Blackmore, Glover) 
 "Space Truckin'" 
 "Smoke on the Water" 
 "Hush" (Joe South)
 Roger Glover Solo
 "Black Night"

Personnel
Deep Purple
Ian Gillan – vocals, harmonica
Steve Morse – guitar
Roger Glover – bass
Ian Paice – drums
Don Airey – keyboards

Orchestra
Neue Philharmonie Frankfurt
Stephen Bentley-Klein – conductor

Production notes
Audio engineer: David Richards
Mixed and mastered by Eike Freese and Alexander Dietz

Chart performance (DVD)

References

Deep Purple live albums
2014 live albums